Balleny Seamounts are seamounts named in association with the Balleny Islands. The name was approved by the Advisory Committee for Undersea Features in June 1988.

References
 

Seamounts of the Southern Ocean